The Journal of Personnel Psychology is a peer-reviewed academic journal published four times per year by  Hogrefe Publishing. It is the continuation of the Zeitschrift für Personalpsychologie, originally published in German from the beginning of 2002 until the end of 2009. Since 2010, the journal is published in English. The Journal of Personnel Psychology “is dedicated to international research in psychology as it relates to the working environment and the people who “inhabit” it." Articles cover all fields in personnel psychology, including "selection, performance measurement, motivation, leadership, organizational commitment, personnel development and training, new test developments, and job analysis."

Indexing and abstracting 
Journal of Personnel Psychology is abstracted/indexed in Current Contents/Social and Behavioral Sciences (CC/S&BS), Social Sciences Citation Index (SSCI), PsyJOURNALS, PsycINFO, PSYNDEX, IBZ, and IBR.

See also 
 Industrial and organizational psychology

External links

References

Personnel psychology journals
Publications established in 2002
Quarterly journals
English-language journals
Differential psychology journals
2002 establishments in Germany
Hogrefe Publishing academic journals